Hodgins is a surname. Notable people  
 Adam King Hodgins (1859–1932), Conservative member of the Canadian House of Commons
 Archie Latimer Hodgins (1876–1966), Progressive party member of the Canadian House of Commons
 Art Hodgins (1927–1988), Canadian ice hockey player
 Charlie Hodgins (born c. 1880), Australian rugby union player
 David Hodgins (1850-1930), member of the Wisconsin Legislature
 Dick Hodgins, Jr., American cartoonist
 Eric Hodgins (1899–1971), American author
 George Frederick Hodgins (1865–1940), merchant and political figure in Quebec
 Isabel Hodgins (born 1993), English actress
 Isaiah Hodgins (born 1998), American football player
 Jack Hodgins (born 1938), Canadian novelist and short story writer
 Jack Hodgins (Bones), a fictional character from the TV series Bones
 James Hodgins (born 1977), free agent fullback with National Football League experience
 John Hodgins (born 1962), Irish retired sportsman
 Liam Hodgins, three time captain of the Galway senior hurling team
 Mark Hodgins (born 1947), Alaska politician
 Philip Hodgins (1959–1995), prize-winning Australian poet
 Robert Hodgins (1920–2010), South African artist
 Thomas Hodgins (1828–1910), Ontario lawyer and political figure
 William H. Hodgins (1856–1912), American law enforcement officer and police captain in the NYPD
 William Thomas Hodgins (1857–1909), farmer and political figure in Ontario Canada
 Karen Murray-Hodgins, basketball player

See also
 Hodgin (disambiguation)